Todd Woodbridge and Mark Woodforde defeated the defending champions John Fitzgerald and Anders Järryd in the final, 6–2, 7–6(7–4), 5–7, 3–6, 6–3 to win the doubles tennis title at the 1992 ATP Tour World Championships. It was the Woodies' first Tour Finals title.

Draw

Finals

Group A
Standings are determined by: 1. number of wins; 2. number of matches; 3. in two-players-ties, head-to-head records; 4. in three-players-ties, percentage of sets won, or of games won; 5. steering-committee decision.

Group B
Standings are determined by: 1. number of wins; 2. number of matches; 3. in two-players-ties, head-to-head records; 4. in three-players-ties, percentage of sets won, or of games won; 5. steering-committee decision.

References
ATP Tour World Championships Doubles Draw

Doubles
Tennis tournaments in South Africa
1992 in South African tennis
Sports competitions in Johannesburg